Smolen or Smoleń is a surname. Notable people with the surname include:

 Bohdan Smoleń (1947–2016), Polish comedian and actor
 Kazimierz Smoleń (1920–2012), Polish political prisoner and museum director
 Michal Smolen (born 1993), American canoeist
 Mike Smolen (1940–1992), American bridge player
 Molly Smolen, American ballet dancer
 Stanisław Smoleń (born 1952), Polish diplomat
 Tomasz Smoleń (born 1983), Polish racing cyclist
 Vivian Smolen (1916–2006), American radio actress

See also
 

Polish-language surnames